Golpayegan County is in Isfahan province, Iran. The capital of the county is the city of Golpayegan. At the 2006 census, the county's population was 82,601 in 24,701 households. The following census in 2011 counted 87,479 people in 28,190 households. At the 2016 census, the county's population was 90,086 in 30,419 households.

Administrative divisions

The population history of Golpayegan County's administrative divisions over three consecutive censuses is shown in the following table. The latest census shows one district, three rural districts, and three cities.

Earthquake of Golpāyagen 

The county's rural areas were devastated in the earthquake of 715 H/1316 AD  According to Mostawfi, in 740 H/1339-40 AD Golpāyegān had some fifty villages, yielding the annual revenue of 42,000 dinars to the state, hinting that the city was very wealthy.

Location, climate and demography 

Golpāyegān is located in Isfahan province, bordered on the south by the Bakhtiaris mountains and Khvansar County, on the east by the county of Barḵhar and Meyma, on the north by the counties of Mahallat and Khomein (Kamare), and on the west by Aligudarz county (province of Lorestān).

It comprises 3 rural districts (Jolge, Kenarruhkhune, nivuun) جلگه، کنار رودخونه، نیوون  and 3 towns, namely, Gugad, Golshahr, and Golpāyegān. Persian: گوگد، گلشهر، گلپایگان

In 1237 H/1821-22 AD, Golpāyegān had some 2,000 households, its population in 1324-25 H/1906-7 AD was 12,000 to 15,000. In 1996 AD the county had a population of 84,081 people, of whom 45,756 lived in urban areas

Ghebla River 

The most important river of Golpāyegān (Ghebla River), runs through the county, irrigating Khomein, Delijān, and Mahallat, before eventually emptying into the Gav ḵhuni salt swamp near Isfahan

Golpayegan Dam (Sade Golpayegan) 

A dam Persian: سد گلپایگان 57 meter high has been constructed on this river at Aḵhteḵhun, located 18 km southeast of Golpāyegān .

Golpayegan's Dam, made by Engineer Aligholi Baiani (مهندس علینقی بیانی), is the first modern dam in Iran.
Irrigation in the area is by qanāt (in Persian:قنات / کاریز), well, and spring waters.

Agricultural products 

Agricultural products include wheat, cotton, barley, grains, sugar, beets, and various kinds of fruits. (apricots, apples, pears, cherries, cantaloupes, cucumbers, grapes, sour cherries, watermelons...)
Golpayegan has lot of Jeliz (in Persian: جیلیز Jeliz = Fruit and Vegetable Garden.

Animal husbandry is also practiced. The region has stands of mountain-almond, (in Persian:بادام کوهی 
wild fig, and barberry, as well as wild thyme, London rocket seed khak shir, milk-vetch,(in Persian:خاکشیر) bugloss, and gum-tragacanth plants.
 
The jackal, fox, wolf, and rabbit are among the wild animals found in the surrounding areas. There are also gold, silver, and gypsum deposits.
 
Golpayegan is famous (not only for Kabab, Kalle Pache (in Persian:کله پاچه) (sheep head, Khash), or Helium turkey...)
is famous for its beautiful Persian rugs.

Handicrafts include carpet-weaving, giva (گیوه) cotton-shoe
production, and wood-carving, Wood Sculpture, inlaid wood and embossed works.

References

 

Counties of Isfahan Province